The 1954–55 Primeira Divisão was the 21st season of top-tier football in Portugal.

Overview

It was contested by 14 teams, and S.L. Benfica won the championship.

League standings

Results

References

Primeira Liga seasons
1954–55 in Portuguese football
Portugal